Cardinia Road railway station is located on the Pakenham line in Victoria, Australia. It serves the south-eastern Melbourne suburb of Pakenham, and opened on 22 April 2012.

History
Announced as part of the Victorian Transport Plan in 2008, construction works for the station officially commenced on 11 October 2010, when the then Minister for Public Transport, Martin Pakula, turned the first sod at the site. On 10 June 2011, the name for the station was confirmed as Cardinia Road. On 15 April 2012, a community open day was held prior to opening, with the station officially opening a week later, on 22 April. Due to power supply issues, only selected peak-hour services stopped at the station, with a substation built later on in that year to allow all peak-hour services to stop.

In 1978, flashing light signals were provided at the former Cardinia Road level crossing, which was located at the up end of the station, with boom barriers being installed in 1986. On 6 December 2020, as part of the Level Crossing Removal Project, the level crossing was grade separated, and replaced with a road overpass. In February 2021, the boom barriers, flashing lights and bells were dismantled.

Platforms and services
Cardinia Road has two side platforms. It is served by Pakenham line trains.

Platform 1:
  all stations and limited express services to Flinders Street

Platform 2:
  all stations services to Pakenham

By late 2025, it is planned that trains on the Pakenham line will be through-routed with those on the Sunbury line, via the new Metro Tunnel.

Transport links
Ventura Bus Lines operates two routes via Cardinia Road station, under contract to Public Transport Victoria:
 : Pakenham station – Westfield Fountain Gate
 : to Pakenham station

Gallery

References

External links

Railway stations in Melbourne
Railway stations in Australia opened in 2012
Railway stations in the Shire of Cardinia